Randy Ryan is an American actor, known for his role in Public Enemies, Salvation Boulevard, Joshua, The Forgotten, 20th Century Women, and The Things We've Seen. His television roles include Sex and the City, Law & Order, Law & Order: Criminal Intent, Third Watch and Medical Investigation.

Filmography

Film

Television

References

External links
 
 Randy Ryan at californiaagtoday.com

Living people
People from Henderson, Tennessee
Male actors from Tennessee
People from South Los Angeles
American gardeners
Year of birth missing (living people)